Andrew Porter (September 24, 1743 – November 16, 1813) was an American officer during the Revolutionary War.

Early life
Porter was born on September 24, 1743 at Norriton, his father's farm near Norristown, Pennsylvania.  He was one of the fourteen children of Robert Porter (1698–1770) and Lileous (née Christy) Porter (1708–1771). His father had immigrated from Derry, Ireland, to New Hampshire in 1720, and later moved to Pennsylvania.

Career
Andrew moved to Philadelphia as a young man, where he became a schoolmaster and amateur astronomer.  In 1776, he joined the American forces in the Revolutionary War as a captain of marines. He later moved to the artillery, in which branch he served at the battles of Trenton, Princeton, Brandywine, Germantown, and Tioga Point. He was later directed by General George Washington to supervise the preparation of artillery ammunition for the Siege of Yorktown.  By the end of the war, he had been promoted to the rank of colonel.

Post Revolutionary War
After the end of the war, Porter continued to serve in a military role with the Pennsylvania militia, rising to the rank of major general.  He also served as the state's surveyor-general, and was one of the commissioners tasked with determining the boundaries between Pennsylvania, Virginia, and Ohio.

He was offered the position of Brigadier general in the U.S. Army, at the end of the War, and United States Secretary of War by President Madison, but he declined both due to his advanced age.

Personal life
Andrew Porter was married twice, first to Elizabeth McDowell (1747–1773), with whom he had five children, including:

 Robert Porter (1768–1842), who married Sarah Williams (1775–1816)
 Elizabeth Rittenhouse Porter (1769–1850), who married Robert Porter Parker (1760–1800) and was the grandmother of Mary Todd Lincoln.

After the death of his first wife, he remarried to Eliza Parker (1750–1821), with whom he had eight more children, including:

 Charlotte Porter (1778–1850), who married Robert Brooke of Virginia
 David Rittenhouse Porter (1788–1867), Governor of Pennsylvania
 Harriett Porter (1788–1864), who married Thomas McKeen (1763–1858)
 George Bryan Porter (1791–1834), Governor of the Michigan Territory
 James Madison Porter (1793–1862), Secretary of War under President John Tyler

Porter died on November 16, 1813 in Harrisburg, Pennsylvania.

Porter Township, Huntingdon County, Pennsylvania formed in 1814 is named for Andrew Porter.

Descendants
His grandson through his son David, Horace Porter (1837–1921), was a Union general in the American Civil War who served as aide-de-camp to General Grant and later U.S. Ambassador to France. He is also a Medal of Honor Recipient. 

His grandson through his son George was Andrew Porter (1820–1872), also a brigadier general in the Union during the American Civil War who was an important staff officer under George B. McClellan during the 1862 Peninsula Campaign, serving as the Provost Marshal of the Army of the Potomac.

Through his daughter Elizabeth, he was the great-grandfather of Mary Todd Lincoln, the wife of 16th President Abraham Lincoln.

References

1743 births
1813 deaths
People from Norristown, Pennsylvania
Continental Army officers from Pennsylvania
Porter family
American people of Irish descent